The Driftin' Kid refers to:

 The Driftin' Kid (1921 film)
 The Driftin' Kid (1941 film)